Joseph Armstrong, known professionally as Joey Carbstrong, is an Australian  animal rights activist. A former criminal,  he has since become an advocate for animal liberation and veganism through social media and public speaking engagements, as well as debates and various televised interviews.

Personal life 
Carbstrong was born Joseph Armstrong in Adelaide, Australia. He has publicly stated that before his fame he was involved in substance abuse and crime. He became a vegan after his release from incarceration. He has a "Vegan" tattoo behind his right ear.

At the age of 14, he had left school and developed a heavy drug addiction. He had various blue-collar jobs before receiving welfare at age 22. By this point he had gained a lengthy criminal record which included three assaults. He spent 18 months under house arrest. An arrest in September 2011 was the result of police discovering a concealed, loaded shotgun which Armstrong was bringing to a drug deal. Multiple weapons and additional ammunition in his hotel room were also discovered and he spent six months in jail. While in jail, he claimed to have had an epiphany and decided to change his life, saying, "I began seeing my life with new eyes. I'd seen all the other prisoners in there and didn't want to be there, I wanted to leave the gangs." In May 2021, he released a video to celebrate his completion of eight years being sober.

Animal rights advocacy 
Carbstrong has been involved in animal rights street activism in Australia, Hong Kong, and the United Kingdom, promoting groups such as Anonymous for the Voiceless and the Save Movement, an organization that holds vigils outside slaughterhouses and promotes veganism by sharing images and footage from farms and slaughterhouses on social media.

Debates
In January 2018, he began a 'Vegan Prophecy UK tour', which involve protesting against multiple slaughterhouses.

In 2018, Carbstrong appeared on the British TV programme This Morning to debate two farmers. During the heated discussion, Carbstrong described artificial insemination of cows as a form of sexual abuse and said the dairy industry "sexually violates" cows. On the Jeremy Vine Show, Carbstrong criticized the host Vine's ham and cheese sandwich.
In 2020 he appeared in Veganville on BBC 3.

See also
List of animal rights advocates
List of vegans

References

External links
 Official website
 

Living people
Australian activists
Australian animal rights activists
Australian people convicted of assault
Australian educators
Australian veganism activists
People from Adelaide
Year of birth missing (living people)